Kusunose (written: 楠瀬) is a Japanese surname. Notable people with the surname include:

 Akihito Kusunose (born 1986), Japanese football player
 Kusunose Yukihiko (1858–1927), general of the Imperial Japanese Army
 Naoki Kusunose (born 1964), Japanese football manager
, Japanese speed skater
 Tsunei Kusunose (1899–1988), Japanese politician

Japanese-language surnames